Canterbury Tales is a musical conceived by Martin Starkie and written by Nevill Coghill and Martin Starkie with music by John Hawkins and Richard Hill. Originally presented at the Oxford Playhouse in 1964, it was expanded into a full-length musical and presented at the Phoenix Theatre, London on 21 March 1968,with Elizabeth Taylor and Richard Burton attending the premiere. It played for a record-breaking 2080 performances and closed on 24 March 1973.

Songs 
 Overture – Orchestra
 Song of Welcome – Host
 Canterbury Day – Pilgrims
 Darling, Let Me Teach You How To Kiss – Absalon
 I Have A Noble Cock – Nicholas
 Pater Noster – Nicholas, Alison, Carpenter
 There's The Moon – Nicholas, Alison
 It Depends on Where You're At – Nun, Wife of Bath, Chorus
 Love Will Conquer All – Prioress, Nun, Chorus
 Beer Is Best – John, Alan, Miller, Molly, Chorus
 Come on And Marry Me, Honey – Wife of Bath
 Where Are The Girls of Yesterday? – Host, Chorus
 If She Has Never Loved Before – January
 I'll Give My Love A Ring – Damien, May
 Pear Tree – May, Proserpina, January, Damian, Pluto
 I Am All Ablaze – Squire
 What Do Women Want? – Knight
 April Song – Village Girls
 Love Will Conquer All (reprise)

References

External links

West End musicals
Broadway musicals
1968 musicals
Musicals based on novels
Works based on The Canterbury Tales
British musicals
Tony Award-winning musicals